"New York, New York" is a song from the American West Coast hip hop duo Tha Dogg Pound. The song is the lead single from their debut album, Dogg Food.

Content 
DJ Pooh produced the song and it never charted. In response to this song East Coast duos Capone-N-Noreaga and Mobb Deep collaborated with Tragedy Khadafi to release a response song named "L.A., L.A." dissing Dogg Pound members. This song also uses a sample of Grandmaster Flash & the Furious Five's song with the same title. It is also considered being a jab at The Notorious B.I.G. because of the use of a similar beat to Notorious B.I.G's St. Ides TV ad. However, Kurupt stated that DJ Pooh gave the Notorious B.I.G. the instrumental originally for the St. Ides commercial.

Music video
The music video was filmed on December 16, 1995 in Red Hook, Brooklyn. In the video Tha Dogg Pound members are rapping around the Skyscrapers in New York. The video, set in New York City, New York, was also heightened when the set was fired upon. After the shooting, Snoop Doggy Dogg and Tha Dogg Pound filmed scenes kicking down a building in New York. It was released for the week ending on February 4, 1996.

Charts

References

1995 singles
Snoop Dogg songs
Tha Dogg Pound songs
Songs written by Snoop Dogg
Songs written by Kurupt
Gangsta rap songs
G-funk songs
Songs about New York City